Standa Procházka (born June 11, 1973 in Pardubice) is a Czech former professional ice hockey player. He plays forward for HC Liberec in the Czech Extraliga. He played in the Czech Extraliga for HC Dynamo Pardubice, Motor České Budějovice and HC Bílí Tygři Liberec. He was captain for Liberec from 2005 to 2008, before Jaroslav Modrý arrived and took over the captaincy.

External links
 
 
 Stanislav Procházka on the official HC Liberec website

1978 births
Czech ice hockey left wingers
HC Benátky nad Jizerou players
HC Bílí Tygři Liberec players
Motor České Budějovice players
HC Dynamo Pardubice players
HC Slovan Ústečtí Lvi players
Living people
Sportspeople from Pardubice
HC Chrudim players